In enzymology, a nucleoside-triphosphate-adenylate kinase is an enzyme that catalyzes the chemical reaction

nucleoside triphosphate + AMP  nucleoside diphosphate + ADP

Thus, the two substrates of this enzyme are nucleoside triphosphate and AMP, whereas its two products are nucleoside diphosphate and ADP.

This enzyme belongs to the family of transferases, specifically those transferring phosphorus-containing groups (phosphotransferases) with a phosphate group as acceptor.  The systematic name of this enzyme class is nucleoside-triphosphate:AMP phosphotransferase. Other names in common use include guanosine triphosphate-adenylate kinase, nucleoside triphosphate-adenosine monophosphate transphosphorylase, GTP:AMP phosphotransferase, and isozyme 3 of adenylate kinase.  This enzyme participates in pyrimidine metabolism.

Structural studies

References

 
 

EC 2.7.4
Enzymes of known structure